Hall Bartlett (November 27, 1922 – September 7, 1993) was an American film producer, director, and screenwriter.

Early life
Hall Bartlett was born in Kansas City, Missouri, he graduated from Yale University Phi Beta Kappa, and was a Rhodes Scholar nominee. He served five years in Naval intelligence, then started his film making career when he began producing the documentary film Navajo, the first contemporary picture to focus attention on the plight of the American Indian. Bartlett was also the first filmmaker to do a picture about professional football: his film Crazylegs was the story of superstar Elroy Hirsch.

Career

1950s 

Bartlett's next film and directorial debut, Unchained, was filmed inside the California Institution for Men at Chino, California. Bartlett spent six months living as an inmate while he wrote the screenplay. The film's musical theme, "Unchained Melody," became an international classic.

Bartlett then acquired the rights to the first novel of Arthur Hailey, Zero Hour!, and made it into a suspense film. The film's plot was later used for Airplane!, the 1980 spoof of disaster films.

Drango, a study of the post American Civil War era, was based on the true story about a Union officer who returned to the land his fellow soldiers had ravaged to try to rebuild the South, as Abraham Lincoln had encouraged before his assassination.

1960s 

All the Young Men, starring Sidney Poitier was about a black man's struggle to achieve first class citizenship.

The Caretakers centered on the problems of mental health and was (at the request of President John F. Kennedy) the first film ever shown on the floor of the United States Senate.

A Global Affair, a story about the first baby ever born in the headquarters of the United Nations in New York City, starred Bob Hope and Lilo Pulver.

Hall's film, Sol Madrid, was made from the Robert Wilder novel, The Fruit of The Poppy.

Changes, a strongly personal examination of the younger generation, was filmed in college communities across the country to record honest insights into issues of the day. The New York Times called the film "one of the most imaginative, haunting and artistic movies yet made. It is a remarkable film and – more than that – a remarkable experience."

1970s 

The Sandpit Generals received international acclaim and was entered into the 7th Moscow International Film Festival.Also released in the USA as “The Defiant”or “The Wild Pack”, the film never reached at home the success of the USSR. In the socialist country, the movie became so well-known hat it inspired theater plays, books, special reports on post-Soviet criminal youth etc.

Bartlett's next film, Jonathan Livingston Seagull, based on the novella of the same name by Richard Bach, would prove to be his most famous achievement as a director. So fascinated was Bartlett by the story that he declared, "I was born to make this movie." He commented, "I felt I had to make this film. I feel very strongly that we're in an age in motion pictures, in all the arts and in life generally, of negativity. People feel that the cards are stacked against them personally so that no one can win. I think Jonathan Livingston Seagull has been such a tremendous success as a novel because it is very positive on terms that any human being can relate to. It says that inside every person is the potential to be something more. By looking into yourself and knowing yourself and reaching for the best within yourself, you or I or anyone can have a different kind of life. That to me is the most needed thing of our time."

However, the release of Jonathan Livingston Seagull was plagued by lawsuits. Bach sued Paramount Pictures before the film's release for having too many discrepancies between the film and the book. The judge ordered the studio to make some rewrites before it was released. Bartlett had allegedly violated a term in his contract with Bach which stated that no changes could be made to the film's adaptation without Bach's consent. Neil Diamond, who wrote the songs featured on the film's soundtrack, also sued the studio for cutting too much of his music from the film. The movie was a flop.

The Search of Zubin Mehta is a story of an extraordinary family, eminently making a high place of cultural achievement in the world.

The Children of Sanchez was written for the screen by Cesare Zavattini based on Oscar Lewis's book of the same title, a classic study of a Mexican family played by Anthony Quinn, Dolores del Río and Lupita Ferrer (Bartlett's then-wife at the time). This film is better known for its Grammy award-winning musical score by Chuck Mangione. The film was entered into the 11th Moscow International Film Festival.

1980s 

Bartlett's final film, the 1983 TV movie, Love is Forever, was based on the true story of one of the most daring escapes in modern history. John Everingham (played in the film by Michael Landon) rescued his Laotian fiancée under the watchful guns of the Pathet Lao Army, executing an unforgettable, exciting, dangerous, and life-risking plan. The plan demanded a year's careful training and study, after Everingham, a top reporter, was imprisoned in Laos, then expelled from the country with a high price for his murder if he ever returned. Bartlett filmed Love Is Forever in Thailand. He is the first person to get permission to shoot on the Mekong River, two miles away from the Army of Laos.

Landon and Bartlett clashed often during the production over a variety of issues  with Bartlett eventually editing the film in secret to avoid Landon's interference.

Personal life and death
Bartlett was heavily involved in the Los Angeles community as a founder of the Music Center, a director of the James Doolittle Theatre, a patron of the Art Museum, a patron of the American Youth Symphony, a board member of KCET, and organizer of the Los Angeles Rams Club and the Los Angeles Lakers Basketball Club.

At the time of his passing in 1993, Bartlett was finishing his second novel for Random House, Face to Face. His first novel, The Rest of Our Lives, was a best seller in 1988. Bartlett had partnered with Michael J. Lasky and developed a dozen projects for the eleven years prior to his death. One of these projects included the film Catch Me If You Can. Bartlett and Lasky both wrote and drafted many scripts for the project with Hall positioned as the director and Lasky producing. The rights were eventually sold and produced/directed by Steven Spielberg, nineteen years after Lasky's first option. In his last days, they were working on a three-picture slate which included the re-mastering of Jonathan Livingston Seagull. The production team grew to include Robert Watts, known for being one of the producers on a number of Spielberg and Lucas films.

Awards
Bartlett's films have received ten Best Picture and Best Director awards at various international film festivals, seventeen Academy Award nominations, eight Hollywood Foreign Press Golden Globe Awards, and more than 75 national and international awards from publications and organizations.

References

Who's Who in America, 47th edition, Marquis, 1992.
Deaths last week. Chicago Tribune, September 19, 1993, Section 2, p. 6.
Hall Bartlett; Wrote, Directed Offbeat Films Los Angeles Times, September 16, 1993, p. A26.
Hall Bartlett, 70, Director of 'Seagull' And a Writer, Dies The New York Times, September 17, 1993, p. B9.

External links

Film directors from Missouri
Film producers from Missouri
Yale University alumni
1922 births
1993 deaths
Writers from Kansas City, Missouri
20th-century American businesspeople
United States Navy personnel of World War II